Reunion at Budokan 1981 is a live album by American jazz group the Modern Jazz Quartet featuring performances recorded at their reunion concert at the Nippon Budokan in 1981 and released on the Pablo label.

Reception
The Allmusic review stated "the group's two biggest 'hits', "Bags' Groove" and "Django" are among the highlights of this excellent release".

Track listing
All compositions by John Lewis except as indicated
 Introduction - 3:01
 "Softly, as in a Morning Sunrise" (Oscar Hammerstein II, Sigmund Romberg) -  6:07   
 "The Cylinder" (Milt Jackson) - 5:32   
 "Really True Blues" (Jackson) - 5:37   
 "The Golden Striker" - 5:53   
 "Odds Against Tomorrow" - 9:09   
 "The Jasmin Tree" - 4:04   
 "Bags' Groove" (Jackson) - 5:41   
 "Django" - 5:31

Personnel
Milt Jackson - vibraphone
John Lewis - piano
Percy Heath - bass
Connie Kay - drums

References

Pablo Records live albums
Modern Jazz Quartet live albums
1981 live albums
Albums recorded at the Nippon Budokan